Foglie d'ulivo (also spelled foglie di ulivo) is a variety of handmade pasta made in the shape of olive leaves. Pasta originating from Puglia and Liguria.

See also
List of pasta

References 

Types of pasta